Thumbcast is a term used for the mobile delivery of text, picture, audio, or video content via short message service, multimedia messaging service, WAP push, or other mobile distribution mechanism. The term is an evolution specialized for original mobile content, coming from the generally audio-based podcast, the input mechanisms of multi-tap and  predictive text, and the distribution of content directly to mobile phones.

Timeline
The company provided the following brief definition for the term: 
Think: podcast for your phone. Our thumbcasts are hand-crafted by local correspondents and delivered direct to you as text messages.

 On 9 April 2007 the Boston Globe published an article titled Snippets of news, via cellphone with the following opening sentence: 
Thumbcasts are coming to Boston.
The term 'thumbcast' became one of that day's 'Hot Searches' on the site.

References

See also 
Podcast - Podcasting
Phonecast - Phonecasting
Screencast - Screen Capture Video Recording
Videocast - Videocasting
Micro-blogging - Micro-blogging

Mobile technology